Golspie railway station is a railway station serving the village of Golspie in the Highland council area of Scotland. ScotRail, who manage the station, operate all services.

History 
It was designed with a combined post office by the architect William Fowler, and opened on 13 April 1868. Originally, it was the northern terminus of the Sutherland Railway, which had been intended to continue to Brora but had run out of money after reaching Golspie. The Duke of Sutherland used his own personal finances to build the line onwards through Brora to Helmsdale, this being the Duke of Sutherland's Railway, completed on 19 June 1871.

The station formerly had two platforms and a passing loop. One platform remains in use and the loop has been lifted. The station building is in an excellent state of repair following recent renovation.

The former goods yard is to the south of the station. The station was host to a LMS caravan from 1935 to 1939. A camping coach was also positioned here by the Scottish Region from 1957 to 1959 and 1964, no coaches were at the station in 1960 and 1961, then a Pullman camping coach was here in 1962, 1963 and 1965 and finally two ordinary coaches were here in 1966 and 1967.

Golspie Station House which sits on the unmanned platform was converted in 2002/2003 to a four bedroom home.

The 'Golspie North' and 'Golspie South' signal boxes are demolished.

Facilities 

The station has one platform, with a small car park, a waiting shelter, bike racks and a help point. As there are no facilities to purchase tickets, passengers must buy one in advance, or from the guard on the train.

Passenger volume 

The statistics cover twelve month periods that start in April.

Services 
On weekdays and Saturdays, there are 4 trains each way (i.e., 4 to Inverness and 4 to Wick). On Sundays, this drops to just one in each direction.

References

External links 

Railway stations in Sutherland
Railway stations in Great Britain opened in 1868
Railway stations served by ScotRail
Former Highland Railway stations
Listed railway stations in Scotland
Category B listed buildings in Highland (council area)
William Fowler railway stations
1868 establishments in Scotland
Golspie